Mircea Cărtărescu (born 1 June 1956) is a Romanian novelist, poet, short-story writer, literary critic, and essayist.

Biography
Born in Bucharest in 1956, he attended Cantemir Vodă National College during the early 1970s. During his school years, he was a member of literary groups led by Nicolae Manolescu and Ovid S. Crohmălniceanu. At that time, along with many teenagers of his generation, Cărtărescu was tremendously influenced by the legacy of the 1960s American counterculture, including artists such as Bob Dylan, Jimi Hendrix, and The Doors. He commenced writing poetry in 1978.

Later, he studied at the University of Bucharest's Faculty of Letters, Department of Romanian Language and Literature. He graduated in 1980 with a thesis that later became his book on poetry, more specifically The Chimaeric Dream. That same year, some of his works were published by Cartea Românească.

Between 1980 and 1989, Cărtărescu worked as a Romanian language teacher, then worked at the Writers' Union of Romania and as an editor at Caiete Critice magazine. In 1991, he became a lecturer at the Chair of Romanian Literary History, part of the University of Bucharest's Faculty of Letters. As of 2010, he was an associate professor there, where he still lectures to this date. Between 1994 and 1995, he was a visiting lecturer at the University of Amsterdam and currently holds the same position at the University of Stuttgart. In 2012, he received the International Literature Award for his novel The Body.

Cărtărescu is married to the Romanian poet , with whom he has a son. His works have been translated into most European languages. He is a full professor at the University of Bucharest within the Department of Literary Studies.

Work
His debut as a writer was in 1978 in România Literară magazine.

Poetry
Faruri, vitrine, fotografii..., ("Headlights, shop windows, photographs...") Cartea Românească, 1980 –  Writers Union Prize, 1980
Poeme de amor ("Love Poems"), Cartea Românească, 1982
Totul ("Everything"), Cartea Românească, 1984
Levantul (The Levant), Cartea Românească, 1990 – Writers Union Prize, 1990, republished by Humanitas in 1998
Dragostea ("Love"), Humanitas, 1994
50 de sonete de Mircea Cărtărescu cu cincizeci de desene de Tudor Jebeleanu ("50 Sonnets by Mircea Cărtărescu With Fifty Drawings by Tudor Jebeleanu"), Brumar 2003
Nimic, Poeme (1988-1992) ("Nothing, Poems, 1988-1992"), Humanitas, 2010
Nu striga niciodată ajutor ("Never Call For Help"), Humanitas, 2020

Prose
Desant '83 (Cartea Românească, 1983)
Visul (Cartea Românească, 1989). The Dream
Nostalgia (Humanitas, 1993; full edition of Visul). Trans. Julian Semilian (New Directions, 2005), with introduction by Andrei Codrescu
Travesti (Humanitas, 1994)
Orbitor, vol. 1, Aripa stângă (Humanitas, 1996). Blinding, Book One: The Left Wing, trans. Sean Cotter (Archipelago Books, 2013)
Jurnal (Humanitas, 2001). 2nd ed.:  Jurnal I, 1990–1996 (Humanitas, 2005)
Orbitor, vol. 2, Corpul (Humanitas, 2002). Blinding, Book Two: The Body
Enciclopedia zmeilor (Humanitas, 2002). The Encyclopedia of Dragons
De ce iubim femeile (Humanitas, 2004). Why We Love Women, trans. Alistair Ian Blyth (University of Plymouth Press, 2011)
Jurnal II, 1997–2003 (Humanitas, 2005). Diary II, 1997–2003
Orbitor, vol. 3, Aripa dreaptă (Humanitas, 2007). Blinding, Book Three: The Right Wing
Frumoasele străine (Humanitas, 2010). Beautiful Strangers
Zen, Jurnal 2004-2010 (Humanitas, 2011). Zen, Diary 2004-2010
Solenoid (Humanitas, 2015). Trans. Sean Cotter (Deep Vellum, 2022)
Un om care scrie, Jurnal 2011-2017 (Humanitas, 2018). A Man Who Writes, Diary 2011-2017
Melancolie (Humanitas, 2019). Melancholy
Theodoros (Humanitas, 2022). Theodoros

Essays
Visul chimeric (subteranele poeziei eminesciene) ("Chimerical Dream – The Underground of Eminescu's Poetry"), Litera, 1991
Postmodernismul românesc ("Romanian Postmodernism"), Ph.D. thesis, Humanitas, 1999
Pururi tânăr, înfășurat în pixeli ("Forever Young, Wrapped in Pixels"), Humanitas, 2003
Baroane! ("You Baron!"), Humanitas, 2005
Ochiul căprui al dragostei noastre ("Our Love's Hazel Eye"), Humanitas, 2012
Peisaj după isterie ("Landscape, After Histrionics"), Humanitas, 2017
Creionul de tâmplărie ("A Carpenter's Pencil"), Humanitas, 2020

Audiobooks
Parfumul aspru al ficțiunii ("The Rough Fragrance of Fiction"), Humanitas, 2003

Anthologies 

 Testament – Anthology of Modern Romanian Verse (1850–2015) second edition – bilingual version English/Romanian. Daniel Ioniță – editor and principal translator, with Eva Foster, Daniel Reynaud and Rochelle Bews. Minerva Publishing House. Bucharest 2015.

Awards and honours

 1980: Romanian Writers' Union Prize
 1989: Romanian Academy's Prize, for Visul
 1990: Romanian Writer's Unions Prize, Flacăra magazine Prize, Ateneu magazine Prize, Tomis magazine Prize, Cuvântul magazine Prize
 1992: Le Rêve nominee for: Prix Médicis, Prix Union Latine, Le meilleur livre étranger
 1994: Romanian Writer's Union Prize, ASPRO Prize, Moldavian Writers' Union Prize, for Travesti
 1996: ASPRO Prize, Flacăra magazine Prize, Ateneu magazine Prize, Tomis magazine Prize, Cuvântul magazine Prize
 1997: Flacăra magazine Prize, Ateneu magazine Prize, Tomis magazine Prize, Cuvântul magazine Prize
 1999: Orbitor'''s French translation nominee for Prix Union Latine
 2000: Romanian Writers Association Prize
 2002: ASPRO Prize, AER Prize
 2006: Grand Officer of the Cultural Merit Order (Ordinul "Meritul cultural" în grad de mare ofițer), awarded by Romanian Presidency
 2011: Vilenica Prize
 2012: International literatur prize "Haus der Kulturen der Welt 2012", Berlin
 2013: Spycher – Literary Prize Leuk, Switzerland
 2013: Grand Prix of the Novi Sad International Poetry Festival
 2014: Best Translated Book Award, shortlisted for Blinding, translated from the Romanian into English by Sean Cotter
 2014: Premio Euskadi de Plata to the Best Book of 2014 for Las Bellas Extranjeras (Frumoasele străine), translated from the Romanian into Spanish by Marian Ochoa de Eribe (Editorial Impedimenta)
 2015: Leipzig Book Award for European Understanding for Blinding 2015: Austrian State Prize for European Literature
 2016: Premio Gregor von Rezzori for Blinding 2018: Thomas Mann Prize
 2018: Prix Formentor
 2022: FIL Award

References

External links
 Excerpt from The Roulette Player (original title: "Ruletistul"), story from Nostalgia, by Mircea Cărtărescu, at WordsWithoutBorders.org 
 Mircea Cărtărescu's page at Humanitas publishing house 
 Mircea Cărtărescu's page at Zsolnay/Hanser Verlage publishing house 
 A review of Nostalgia'' by Joshua Cohen at New Haven Review New Haven Review
Cartarescu meets his readers at the International Book Fair of Turin, Italy

1956 births
Living people
University of Bucharest alumni
International Writing Program alumni
Academic staff of the University of Bucharest
Romanian essayists
20th-century Romanian poets
Romanian novelists
Romanian male novelists
Postmodern writers
Male essayists
21st-century Romanian poets
Romanian male poets
20th-century Romanian male writers
21st-century male writers
Writers from Bucharest